The Ghost Goes Wild is a 1947 American comedy film directed by George Blair and written by Randall Faye. The film stars James Ellison, Anne Gwynne, Edward Everett Horton, Ruth Donnelly, Stephanie Bachelor and Grant Withers. It was released on March 8, 1947 by Republic Pictures.

Plot

Cast   
James Ellison as Monte Crandall
Anne Gwynne as Phyllis Beecher
Edward Everett Horton as Eric
Ruth Donnelly as Aunt Susan Beecher
Stephanie Bachelor as Irene Winters
Grant Withers as Bill Winters
Lloyd Corrigan as The Late Timothy Beecher
Emil Rameau as Prof. Jacques Dubonnet
Jonathan Hale as Max Atterbury
Charles Halton as T. O'Connor Scott
Holmes Herbert as Judge
Edward Gargan as Newsstand Man
Eugene Gericke as Reporter 
Michael Hughes as Reporter
William Austin as Barnaby
Robert J. Wilke as Burglar

References

External links
 

1947 films
American comedy films
1947 comedy films
Republic Pictures films
Films directed by George Blair
American black-and-white films
1940s English-language films
1940s American films